Cylindrocranius is a genus of beetles in the family Carabidae, containing the following species:

 Cylindrocranius cribricollis (Fairmaire, 1904)
 Cylindrocranius errans Peringuey, 1896
 Cylindrocranius risbeci Basilewsky, 1948
 Cylindrocranius ruficollis Peringuey, 1896
 Cylindrocranius rufulus Chaudoir, 1878

References

Lebiinae